Dan Poynter (September 17, 1938 – November 3, 2015) was an American author, consultant, publisher, professional speaker and parachute designer.

Starting in 1969, he wrote more than 130 books, many reports, and more than 800 magazine articles, most of them on book publishing. The writing and publishing of The Self-Publishing Manual in 1979 propelled him to notoriety in the publishing industry. Each year he addressed scores of groups on the subject of publishing.

He was the founder of Para Publishing and was featured in many major media outlets, including Entrepreneur,  U.S. News & World Report, The Christian Science Monitor, 'The Wall Street Journal', The Washington Post, Writer's Digest and The New York Times.

Career

He began his career managing a parachute company in Oakland, California. From there, he moved east where he became a parachute design specialist. An active skydiver, he began writing about parachute design and use. His column in Parachutist Magazine led him to writing books on parachutes and skydiving. Dan became active in the politics of the sport when elected to the board of the Parachute Club of America, later the U.S. Parachute Association.

In 1973, he became interested in the new sport of hang gliding. Unable to find a book on the new sport, he researched, drew from his experience as a pilot and skydiver, and wrote the first book on the subject. He was elected to the board of the U.S. Hang Gliding Association, later the U.S. Hang Gliding & Paragliding Association (USHPA). Later, he served as president of the Commission Internationale du Vol Libre (hang gliding) of the Fédération Aéronautique Internationale in Paris.
 
In 1979, drawing on what he learned in book writing and publishing, he wrote The Self-Publishing Manual. Continuing to write and publish, he produced a circular book on Frisbee play that came with a frisbee, the first book on word processors, pioneered fax-on-demand, began selling information products from his website in 1996, wrote many more books on writing, publishing, and book promoting and began speaking on the subjects worldwide.

He continued to edit and publish newsletters on book writing/publishing and professional speaking. He edited and published blogs on book writing/publishing and air travel. Poynter earned a Bachelor of Arts in Social Science from California State University, Chico and also attended San Francisco Law School.

Poynter was Editor of the Publishing Poynters newsletter on the book industry since 1986 and the Global Speakers Federation NewsBrief for international professional speakers since 2006.

Poynter was an expert skydiver who had been active in the industry since 1962. He wrote more books on parachutes and skydiving than any other author. He served in elective office in various aviation associations including the United States Parachute Association (chairman of the board), The Parachute Industry Association (President), the U.S. Hang Gliding Association (director), and the Commission Internationale du Vol Libre (hang gliding) of the Fédération Aéronautique Internationale (president).

He invented the Stylemaster parachute, the Fastbak parachute, revolving cones, Tri-vent modification for reserve canopies, and patented the Pop Top parachute.

He was appointed trustee and elected secretary of the American Museum of Sport Parachuting and Air Safety, later the National Skydiving Museum along with being appointed Curator and placed in charge of the inventory of the National Skydiving Museum. Poynter established the eMuseum for the National Skydiving Museum in 2014.

He was diagnosed with Chromosome 19 Trisomy in 2012, and a stem cell transplant was performed in mid-2013. He fully recovered in 2014, and wrote a book on his experiences, Transplant Handbook for Patients: Replacing Stem Cells in Your Bone Marrow.

He died on November 3, 2015, of acute myeloid leukemia and renal failure.

Awards
Certificate of Recognition by the County of Santa Barbara
Certificate of Special Congressional Recognition by Congresswoman Lois Capps
Lifetime Achievement Award, U.S. Parachute Association (1980)
Benjamin Franklin Person of the Year Award for Lifetime Achievement (Publishers Marketing Association, 1992)
Irwin Award (Book Publishers of Southern California, 1995)
Certified Speaking Professional (National Speakers Association, 2004)
Lifetime Achievement Award, Parachute Industry Association (2005).
Lifetime Achievement Award in Publishing (Express Yourself Authors' Conference, 2007)
President's Award for Service (Global Speakers Federation, 2007)
International Ambassador Award (Global Speakers Federation, 2008)
Honorary Lifetime Membership (German Speakers Association, 2011)
Inducted into the National Skydiving Museum Hall of Fame, 2012.
Appointed to Global Speakers Summit Organizing Committee and named a Global Certified Speaking Professional (Global Speakers Federation, 2013)
Bronze Otto Lilienthal Medal (U.S. Hang Gliding Association)

Books

References 

1938 births
2015 deaths
American businesspeople
American self-help writers
California State University, Chico alumni